Banu Murra was a tribe during the era of the Islamic prophet Muhammad. They participated in the Battle of the Trench.

They were members of the Ghatafan tribe

See also
List of battles of Muhammad

References

Murra
tribes of Arabia